Virgibacillus subterraneus is a Gram-positive and moderately halophilic bacterium from the genus of Virgibacillus which has been isolated from saline soil from the Qaidam Basin in China.

References

Bacillaceae
Bacteria described in 2010